The Ministry of Jal Shakti of the Government of India has declared 75 sites in India as the Water Heritage Sites. These sites are more than hundred years old and of historical importance.

History
On occasion of 75 years of the Independence of India, the Ministry of Jal Shakti constituted a committee to identify the heritage water sites. Total 421 nominations were received from the states, union territories, central government agencies and people. Total 75 sites were selected and presented on its website on 5 January 2023 during the 1st All India State Ministers Conference on Water at Bhopal, Madhya Pradesh.

List of Water Heritage Sites in India

See also

 National Geological Monuments of India
 Monuments of National Importance of India
 State Protected Monuments of India
 List of World Heritage Sites in India
 List of columnar jointed volcanics in India
 Menhirs in India
 List of rock-cut temples in India
 List of forts in India
 List of museums in India

References

Exteranl links
 Interactive Map

Tourism in India
Lists of landforms of India